Dream Radio 104.7 (DYAB 104.7 MHz) is an FM station owned by Allied Broadcasting Center and operated under airtime lease agreement by Prime Media Services. Its studios and transmitter are located at the Ground Floor, Residencia Marfel, #23 Lukban St., Tacloban.

The frequency was formerly occupied by Kaboses Radio from its inception in 2018 to the end of 2022, when it swapped frequencies with sister station Dream Radio.

References

External links
Dream Radio FB Page
Dream Radio Website

Radio stations in Tacloban
Radio stations established in 2018